The Kun Peak is a part of Nun Kun mountain massif in Ladakh, India. It is located about 61 km south of Kargil and 141 km west of Leh.

The Kun Peak is located north of Nun Peak  which is the highest summit of the massif and is separated from it by a snowy plateau of 4 km in length, in the northeast just at a distance of 2 km rises another peak of the massif known as Pinnacle Peak .

Mountaineering
The Nun Kun massif was first sighted in 1898 and three visits by Arthur Neve, in 1902, 1904, and 1910. In 1903, Dutch mountaineer Dr. H. Sillem investigated the massif and discovered the high plateau between the peaks; he reached an altitude of 6,400 m (21,000 ft) on Nun. In 1906, the Pinnacle Peak was first ascended by a noted explorer couple Fanny Bullock Workman and her husband William Hunter Workman. They also toured extensively through the massif and produced a map; however, controversy surrounded the Workmans' claims, and few trigonometrical points were given for the region, so that the map they produced was not usable. The Kun Peak was first successfully climbed by an Italian mountaineering team led by Mario Piacenza, Lorenzo Borelli in 1913.

The massif is accessed by 210 kilometers by road from Srinagar NH 1D up to Kargil and then 80 kilometers via Kargil Zanskar road.

References

External links
 Suru and Zanskar valley
 Kun Expedition
 Topography of Nun Kun ex Geographical Journal 1920

Seven-thousanders of the Himalayas
Climbing areas of India
Mountains of Ladakh